Symphoromyia (meaning bane/blight fly in Greek) is a genus of predatory snipe flies. Unusually for Rhagionids, some species of Symphoromyia are known to feed on mammal blood, including human blood. Symphoromyia species are stout bodied flies from 4.5 to 9 mm and with a black, grey or gold thorax, and the abdomen is coloured grey, black, or both black and yellow, black terminating with yellow, to completely yellow. The wings are hyaline or lightly infuscate.

Species
Symphoromyia algens Leonard, 1931
Symphoromyia atripes Bigot, 1887
Symphoromyia barbata Aldrich, 1915
Symphoromyia cervivora Turner & Chillcott, 1973
Symphoromyia cinerea Johnson, 1903
Symphoromyia clerci Ngô-Muller & Nel, 2020
Symphoromyia crassicornis (Panzer, 1808)
Symphoromyia cruenta Coquillett, 1894
Symphoromyia currani Leonard, 1931
Symphoromyia evecta (Meunier, 1910)
Symphoromyia examinata (Meunier, 1910)
Symphoromyia exigua (Meunier, 1910)
Symphoromyia fulvipes Bigot, 1887
Symphoromyia hirta Johnson, 1897
Symphoromyia immaculata (Meigen, 1804)
Symphoromyia inconspicua Turner & Chillcott, 1973
Symphoromyia incorrupta Yang, Yang & Nagatomi, 1997
Symphoromyia inquisitor Aldrich, 1915
Symphoromyia johnsoni Coquillett, 1894
Symphoromyia kincaidi Aldrich, 1915
Symphoromyia limata Coquillett, 1894
Symphoromyia liupanshana Yang, Dong & Zhang, 2016
Symphoromyia marginata Théobald, 1937
Symphoromyia melaena (Meigen, 1820)
Symphoromyia montana Aldrich, 1915
Symphoromyia nana Turner & Chillcott, 1973
Symphoromyia nigripilosa Yang, Dong & Zhang, 2016
Symphoromyia pachyceras Williston, 1886
Symphoromyia pallipilosa Yang, Dong & Zhang, 2016
Symphoromyia pilosa Aldrich, 1915
Symphoromyia plagens Williston, 1886
Symphoromyia pleuralis Curran, 1930
Symphoromyia plumbea Aldrich, 1915
Symphoromyia pullata Coquillett, 1894
Symphoromyia sackeni Aldrich, 1915
Symphoromyia securifera Coquillett, 1904
Symphoromyia sinensis Yang & Yang, 1997
Symphoromyia spitzeri Chvála, 1983
Symphoromyia subtrita Cockerell, 1911
Symphoromyia succini Paramonov, 1938
Symphoromyia tertiarica Paramonov, 1938
Symphoromyia trivittata Bigot, 1887
Symphoromyia trucis Coquillett, 1894
Symphoromyia truncata Turner, 1973
Symphoromyia varicornis (Loew, 1872)

References

Rhagionidae
Brachycera genera
Diptera of Asia
Diptera of North America
Diptera of Europe
Taxa named by Georg Ritter von Frauenfeld